Webb Sanitarium was a Bronx hospital that expanded in 1938. Even prior to that, Webb (located at 188th Street and Webb Avenue) served as a general hospital, including medical/surgical and maternity services.

Notable deaths 
 Edward J. Walsh

References 

Defunct hospitals in the Bronx
History of the Bronx
Fordham, Bronx